Kalifabougou  is a small town and rural commune in the Cercle of Kati in the Koulikoro Region of south-western Mali. The commune includes 12 villages and covers an area of 241 km2. In the 2009 census the population of the commune was 4,796. The village of Kalifabougou is 30 km northwest of Kati, the chef-lieu of the cercle.

References

External links
.

Communes of Koulikoro Region